Mary Warburton Sandbach born Mary Warburton Matthews (April 25, 1901 – November 3, 1990) was a British translator. She is noted for her translations of the Swedish writer August Strindberg.

Life
Sandbach was born in Edgbaston in 1901. Her parents were Miriam (born Warburton) and Arthur Daniel Mathews. Her father was a foundry owner who went bankrupt. She experimated with attending
Edgbaston High School for Girls but she preferred to be home educated by her mum. She was not considered academic unlike her sister who went to attend Newnham College in Cambridge. Mary had no formal educational qualifications.

In 1922 she began her interest in Scandinavia when she boldly set out to be an au pair there. This was her second choice as her skill with the violin had failed to get her a place at the Royal School of Music. She was there for a year but in 1925 she began four years in Sweden.

She returned to Birmingham where she studied speech therapy and she volunteered to assist in prisons. By the second world war she was in Cambridge where her husband was a professor of classics. They were both employed by the Afmiralty and she worked in intelligence reading the Norwegain press. In 1940 she published her first book that was drew on her experience in Iceland which she had visited after the death of their first child in the 1930s.

Sandbach was given an early commission by the Swedish Institute to translate future Nobel Laureate Eyvind Johnson's novel 1914 into English. She translated the work and assisted with placing the book with a publisher. She became known for her translations from the Scandinavian languages of Danish, Swedish and Norwegian. She was noted for her stranslation of Strindberg. August Strindberg is know for his innovative style in Swedish and Sandbach, terse style in English is thought to be a good approach. Her Strindberg translations include Inferno, Getting Married and From an Occult Diary.

Sandbach died in 1990 in Cambridge.

Translations include
 1914 by Eyvind Johnson (1970)
 Getting married Parts I and II by August Strindberg, 1972

Private life
She married in 1932 and she and Francis Henry (Harry) Sandbach had a daughter and a son in the 1940s.

References

1901 births
1990 deaths
People from Edgbaston
Translators from Norwegian
Translators from Danish
Translators from Swedish